Anthotroche is a  genus of shrubs in the family Solanaceae. The genus is endemic to Western Australia.

Species include:

Anthotroche myoporoides - Myoporum-like anthotroche C.A.Gardner
Anthotroche pannosa - Endl. Felted anthotroche
Anthotroche walcottii F.Muell.

The genus was first formally described by Austrian botanist Stephan Endlicher in 1839 in Novarum Stirpium Decades. The type species is Anthotroche pannosa.

References

Nicotianoideae
Solanaceae genera